Gordon C. Rhea is an American lawyer and historian who specializes in the American Civil War, especially the Overland Campaign.

Career 
Rhea received the Civil War Regiments Book Award for his book on the Battle of the Wilderness, The Battle of the Wilderness, May 5–6, 1864.  His work on the Battle of Cold Harbor, Cold Harbor, received the Austin Civil War Round Table's Laney Prize. Rhea has lectured at the U.S. Army Training and Doctrine Command and for Civil War round tables.

Rhea has provided commentary for CNN.

Selected works 
The Battle of the Wilderness, May 5–6, 1864.  Baton Rouge: Louisiana State University Press, 1994.  
The Battles for Spotsylvania Court House and the Road to Yellow Tavern, May 7–12, 1864. Baton Rouge: Louisiana State University Press, 1997.  
Cold Harbor: Grant and Lee, May 26–June 3, 1864. Baton Rouge: Louisiana State University Press, 2002.  
To the North Anna River: Grant and Lee, May 13–25, 1864. Baton Rouge: Louisiana State University Press, 2000.  
Carrying the Flag: The Story of Private Charles Whilden, the Confederacy's Unlikely Hero. New York: Basic Books, 2004.  
On to Petersburg: Grant and Lee, June 4–14, 1864. 	Baton Rouge: Louisiana State University Press, 2017.

Personal life 
Rhea is married with two sons.

References

External links

American historians
American lawyers
Historians of the American Civil War
Living people
Year of birth missing (living people)